Ideal Standard is a privately held multinational plumbing fixture company headquartered in Belgium. It operates primarily in Europe and Latin America. The brand dates back to 1949, when it was used to brand fixtures of the foreign operations of the American Standard group. The "Ideal" name traces back to the "Ideal Boilers" brand used by the American Radiator Company.

Overview

A new company, known as Ideal Standard International, was formed in 2007 by the sale of the bath and kitchen products businesses of American Standard Companies for $1.745 billion to Bain Capital Partners. The North American and Asian operations of American Standard were sold to Sun Capital and Lixil Group respectively, with the European and Latin American operations retained as Ideal Standard.

The company was then restructured, implementing cost-cutting measures, as well as moving some of company's production facilities to Asia and Eastern Europe – a new production site was opened in Bulgaria. The acquisition by Bain Capital was facilitated by Credit Suisse and Bank of America; the creditors subsequently struggled to dispose of their debt.

The restructuring program was complete in 2011, but the company was loss making in 2012 due to poor sales. In 2013 the company reduced its workforce by 250 due to poor sales; further restructuring was proposed in 2014, including a debt for equity swap with bondholder Anchorage Capital. In 2014 the EU competition commission approved Anchorage Capital becoming joint owner of the company together with Bain Capital.

 the company was headquartered in Belgium, and had over 10,000 employees. Its products include bathroom fittings including bathrooms, sanitary ware, and showers, sold under brands including Armitage Shanks, Ceramica Dolomite, Porcher, and Vidima.

See also
 Ideal House, London
 American Radiator Company and Standard Sanitary Manufacturing Company, predecessor companies

References

External links
 

Bathroom fixture companies
Private equity portfolio companies
Companies based in Flemish Brabant
Belgian brands
Zaventem